Syagrus rupicola is a short species belonging to the palm family (Arecaceae), found only in Brazil, and was first described by Larry Noblick and Harri Lorenzi in 2010.

Description 
The height of a mature Syagrus rupicola ranges from 4-6 ft and it appears to be stemless. As it matures, to a height of approximately 1 meter, its short underground stem spans 10-20 centimeters. It possesses large pistillate flowers, and its fruits split at the apex. A perpendicular bract, fibrous and fleshy mesocarp, as well as silvery-blue leaves are some defining characteristics of Syagrus rupicola. The leaves of this species has a leathery texture The leaves are approximately 1 meter long and arched with a 3-6 inch crown. They are grouped into clusters of 2-5 and appear to be angled at different positions along the stem. The stalk that bears the plant's fruit grows to be 30-40 centimeters long. Syagrus rupicola has a woody perpendicular bract. This species can be referred to as "sawtooth", "fox llicuri", or "palm of stone." This palm has a light frost tolerance, and grows at a slow, steady rate.

Etymology 
The species name "rupicola" translates to "rock-dweller" in English.

Distribution 
Syagrus rupicola is native to the Chapada dos Veadeiros region in the state of Goias, Brazil. It is known to favor high-altitude terrains of over 1,000 meters. This palm species generally grows optimally in well-drained, rocky soil types.

Ideal growth conditions 
From an early age, S. rupicola requires a lot of sun to grow. It has a high wind tolerance, making it capable of growing in conditions with high disturbance. S. rupicola grows in light shade in dry, hot climates; it requires moderate amounts of water for growth.

Uses/cultivation 
Serves as a food source for small animals and humans.  This species is used for its seeds, landscaping, and for ornamental purposes. The perpendicular bract of this species is used in many handicrafts.

Properties 
This species possesses male and female reproductive organs, making it a monoecious evergreen species.

See also 
 Syagrus (plant)

References 

Dave’s Garden. (2019). Syagrus Species, Palm. Retrieved from https://davesgarden.com/guides/pf/go/219773/

Noblick , L., & Lorenzi , H. (2010). New Syagrus species from Brazil . Palms , 54. Retrieved from https://www.researchgate.net/profile/Larry_Noblick/publication/235675933_New_Syagrus_species_from_Brazil/links/09e41512776560c7ff000000/New-Syagrus-species-from-Brazil.pdf 

Quattrocchi, U. (2017). Crc world dictionary of palms: common names, scientific names, eponyms, synonyms, and etymologynVolume I. Boca Raton ; London ; New York: CRC Press, Taylor et Francis Group.

Syagrus rupicola. (2019). Retrieved December 2, 2019, from https://www.rarepalmseeds.com/syagrus-rupicola.

rupicola
Flora of Brazil
Endangered plants